Mar Roukouz or Mar Roukoz ( translit. Mar Roukouz) is a village in the Matn District of the Mount Lebanon Governorate, Lebanon.

Overview
Mar Roukoz is mostly a residential region. Notable places include the School of Engineering and the Faculty of Science of Saint Joseph University, as well as several country clubs, and a water park.
The village is under the administration of the Municipality of Dekwaneh, and is officially a part of the region of Dahr el Hossein.

Etymology
The region is named after Saint Roch (Mar Roukoz in Arabic) Monastery which is built on a prominent hill, and serves as the headquarters of the Maronite Antonine Order. The monastery was established in 1768.

Geography

Demographics

References and footnotes

External links

Populated places in the Matn District